Mount Roper is a prominent peak rising to 3,660 m, located 3.2 km south of Mount Hooker in Victoria Land, Antarctica.

The peak was named by the New Zealand Geographic Board in 1994 after Cas Roper (died 1994), a scientist with the NZ Antarctic Programme who oversaw Scott Base laboratory programs for over twenty years.

References

Mountains of Victoria Land
Scott Coast